is an English trusts law case, concerning the test for causation and the extent of compensation for breaches of trust.

Facts
Target Holdings Ltd gave £1,525,000 to Redferns solicitors, ultimately to be loaned to Crowngate Developments Ltd to buy property at 60-64 Great Hampton Street, Hockley. Target Holdings Ltd would get a mortgage over the property that was bought, and Redferns were under instructions to not release the money until the purchase was completed, and the mortgage was executed. Until then, the solicitors were to hold the money on trust for Target Holdings Ltd. Crowngate, however, had orchestrated a scheme to make a fraudulent profit on the property which it was actually buying at £775,000, while reporting the purchase was for £2m. Breaching the terms of the agreement, Redferns in fact released £1,490,000 to a company called Panther Ltd before the purchase was completed. The sale went through, but the venture turned out to be a flop. Crowngate failed to repay the loan, and went into liquidation, meaning that Target Holdings Ltd only ever recovered £500,000 from the sale of the property. Target Holdings Ltd sued Redferns solicitors, arguing that it had a duty to account for the money it had wrongly paid away. Redferns argued that, even though it had breached the trust, this had nothing to do with the loss that Target Holdings Ltd had incurred. The loss was not caused by the breach.

Warner J held that Redferns breached its trust. In the Court of Appeal Hirst LJ and Peter Gibson LJ held that when Redferns misapplied the trust property, this generated an immediate liability as trustees to reconstitute the trust fund. That did not depend on showing that the loss would not have been suffered but for the breach. Ralph Gibson LJ dissented.

Judgment
The House of Lords held that Redferns did not have to repay the £1,490,000, because the loss to the trust would have been the same. Only losses that were caused by Redfern's breach of the trust terms could be recovered. Although the test in the law of tort might differ, and allow remoteness limits or have dissimilar causation outcomes, some causal connection was needed between the fiduciary's breach of trust and the loss that resulted to the claimant. So because Redfern's payment away of the trust property early had nothing to do with the ultimate losses of Target Holdings Ltd, they were not liable to repay that money.

Lord Browne-Wilkinson gave the leading judgment.

See also
English trusts law
South Australia Asset Management Corpn v York Montague Ltd [1996] UKHL 10

Notes

References
Smith v The London and South Western Railway Company (1870–71) LR 6 CP 14, directness test held to prevail

English trusts case law
1995 in case law
1995 in British law
House of Lords cases